Kidnapping of Czech tourists in Balochistan occurred on 14 March 2013 when two Czech female tourists, Antonie Chrástecká (25) and Hana Humpálová (24), were abducted along with a Pakistani police officer near Nok Kundi while traveling by bus through southern Pakistan's Balochistan region en route to India. The officer was later released.

The kidnappers demanded (through video) the release of Aafia Siddiqui, a national of Pakistan imprisoned in the United States. A second video, released on October 30, shows Antonie Chrástecká and Hana Humpálová reading statements about their burial wishes.

A rescue mission was planned by a Czech intelligence agency and the US army. However, the operation was delayed because of a sand storm; meanwhile, the kidnapped were moved to another location.

In March 2015, both tourists were released and safely returned to the Czech Republic following negotiations by the Turkish IHH Humanitarian Relief Foundation.

See also
 Foreign hostages in Pakistan
 Overland route Europe - India (Hippie trail)

References 

2013 crimes in Pakistan
2013 in the Czech Republic
Foreign hostages in Pakistan
Czech victims of crime
Kidnappings in Pakistan
Czech Republic–Pakistan relations
Crime in Balochistan, Pakistan
March 2013 crimes in Asia